Huguette is a feminine French given name. Notable people with the name include:

 Huguette Bello (born 1950), politician from Reunion
 Huguette Béolet (1919–unknown), French table tennis player
 Huguette Bouchardeau (born 1935), French politician
 Huguette Bohoussou, Ivorian footballer
 Huguette Caland (1931–2019), Lebanese painter, sculptor and fashion designer
 Huguette M. Clark (1906–2011), French-American heiress and recluse
 Huguette Delavault (1924–2003), French mathematician
 Huguette Desjardins (born 1938), Canadian artist
 Huguette Dreyfus (born 1928), French harpsichordist
 Huguette Duflos (1887–1982), French actress
 Huguette Gaulin (1944–1972), French novelist
 Huguette Labelle (born 1939), retired Canadian civil servant
 Huguette Lachapelle (born 1942), Canadian politician
 Huguette Oligny (1922–2013), Canadian actress
 Huguette Peeters (born 1936), Belgian swimmer
 Huguette Plamondon (1926–2010), Canadian politician and trade unionist
 Huguette Tiegna (born 1982), French politician
 Huguette Tourangeau (1940–2013), French-Canadian operatic mezzo-soprano

See also
 Hugues (disambiguation)

French feminine given names